Sir Owen Buckingham (c. 1649 – 20 March 1713) was an English merchant, alderman, MP and Lord Mayor of London.

He was born the son of George Buckingham, an innkeeper of Stanwell, Middlesex. By 1680 he was a liveryman in the Butchers’ Company of the City of London and by 1692 a liveryman of the Salter's Company.

He became involved in local city politics and was a common councilman for London in 1689–90 and 1691–1696 and an alderman from 1696 to his death. He was appointed Sheriff of London for 1695–96, knighted the same year and elected Lord Mayor of London for 1704–05. In 1697 he was Colonel of the Blue Regiment, London Trained Bands.

As a result of a promise to manufacture sailcloth in the town he was elected MP for Reading in 1698, and again in 1701, 1702 and 1705, giving up the seat in 1708 in favour of his son, also Owen Buckingham.

By virtue of his own enterprise and a succession of favourable marriages he became quite wealthy and by 1706 had purchased the Fettiplace family estates at Earley near Reading in Berkshire.

He died in 1713. He had married 6 times but was survived by only the one son and heir Owen and two daughters from his first marriage.

Notes

References
 
 Col George Jackson Hay, An Epitomized History of the Militia (The Constitutional Force), London: United Service Gazette, 1905.

1640s births
1713 deaths

Year of birth uncertain
People from Stanwell
People from Earley
Sheriffs of the City of London
18th-century lord mayors of London
London Trained Bands officers
English MPs 1698–1700
English MPs 1701
English MPs 1702–1705
English MPs 1705–1707
Members of the Parliament of Great Britain for English constituencies
British MPs 1707–1708